Climbing protection are mechanical man-made devices employed to reduce the risk and effect of a fall to climbers while rock or ice.  It includes such items as nylon webbing and metal nuts, cams, bolts, and pitons.

Different forms of climbing draw on varying forms of protection and the systems that are created from its elements.

Types of climbing 

There are a number of ways to "protect" a climb, varying according to the type of climbing:

Lead climbing

A lead climber places protection (temporary or permanent anchors) in the rock, snow, or ice establishing a climbing route. The rope is clipped through carabiners (often joined by a short length of webbing into a pair known as a quickdraw) which are in turn  connected to the protection. The belayer pays out rope during the ascent, and manually arrests the climber's fall by locking the rope, typically with some form of belay device.

Aid climbing

Aid climbing involves standing on or pulling oneself up via devices attached to fixed or placed protection to make upward progress. In contrast to free climbing protection, which can sustain the force of sometimes long falls, some aid protection is only designed to hold one's body weight.

Top roping

Top roping involves either placing an anchor at the top of a route before climbing or utilizing a fixed one, then running a rope through it to a belayer on the ground.  Unlike in lead climbing, the belayer takes in rope as the climber advances and slack is practically eliminated from the rope, minimizing both the drop and shock load on the rope and protection system should the climber fall.

Soloing

Solo climbing involves climbing without a partner. Soloing can be done with or without protection. A solo climber may place protection and clip in with a short tether for safety during a difficult move, then remove the protection and continue the ascent.  Or they may employ some form of self-locking device, such as a Silent Partner, in lieu of a belayer, allowing a soloist to climb without a partner. Additionally, soloing can also be done using a top rope.

Bouldering

Bouldering involves climbing routes low to the ground without rope.  The chief form of protection from injury used is a bouldering mat, a padded foam-cell mat placed on the ground below a climber. In bouldering, one can also utilize a "spotter". A spotter is someone who stands near the bouldering mat and guides the climber to the mat in the event of a fall.

Equipment 

The gear used to protect climbs includes:
 Slings are loops of nylon webbing (also called "tape"), cord, Dyneema, or rope.  They can be tied around natural features such as rock spikes or trees, threaded through natural holes in the rock, round natural chockstones, or through artificial anchors such as metal hangers, chains, or rings.  Also known as runners, they are used to temporarily attach a climber's harness directly to an anchor. They can also be used to extend other pieces of protection to avoid compromise due to rope drag.
 Nuts, chocks, or simple cams are metal devices placed in constrictions in cracks and attached to carabiners with wire or nylon slings.
 Tricams, a nut/cam hybrid that can be placed as a nut or as a passive camming device
 Spring-loaded camming device (SLCDs) use multiple cams in opposition, which expand in a crack as the device is weighted.  These can be placed even in parallel and outward flaring cracks.
 Bolts are anchors fixed in holes drilled in the rock and clipped by the climber with a carabiner. They are placed both by climbers putting up new routes, particularly in aid climbing, and as permanent fixtures on popular routes to reduce wear on rock features.
 Pitons are metal spikes hammered or hand-placed in thin cracks and clipped through an eye in the piton to a carabiner.
 Skyhooks are talon shaped hooks placed over very small ledges and flakes and secured to a carabiner. Usually found in aid climbing, they are occasionally utilized in free climbing as extremely marginal protection.

Fixed protection usually consists of permanently anchored bolts fitted with hangers, a chain, and ring, or pitons left in situ.

Standards 

There are two major standards for climbing equipment safety and reliability worldwide:
 UIAA (International Mountaineering and Climbing Federation)
 CEN (European Committee for Standardization)

In recent years, the CEN has become an important standards organization, mainly in Europe since any products sold in Europe must by law be third-party certified to the relevant standards.  There is no such requirement in most other countries, although most manufacturers voluntarily follow UIAA or CEN standards (much like electrical equipment in the US is almost always privately certified by Underwriters Laboratories).

CEN
In Europe, equipment used by climbers has to meet the requirements of the Personal and Protective Equipment (PPE) Directive.  Essentially, the equipment must be manufactured using a carefully controlled process and samples must pass various tests.  Equipment meeting the regulations is marked with the CE Mark.  Various standards are used to specify how equipment is to be tested:

 EN 12270:1998 "Mountaineering equipment. Chocks. Safety requirements and test methods."
 EN 892:1997 "Mountaineering equipment. Dynamic Mountaineering ropes. Safety requirements and test methods"
 EN 12276:1999 "Mountaineering equipment. Frictional anchors. Safety requirements and test methods" (covers SLCDs)

There are many more, most of them appearing in ICS code 97.220.40 and having "Mountaineering" in the title.

UIAA
The UIAA Safety Commission develops and maintains safety standards for climbing equipment. These standards are implemented world-wide by the manufacturers who also participate in annual Safety Commission meetings. The Commission works with nearly 60 manufacturers world-wide and has 1861 products certified.

In the mid-nineties, CEN adopted the UIAA Safety Standards. Both commissions in CEN and UIAA share similar members.

References 

Protection
Mountaineering equipment